Trichromium silicide is an inorganic compound of chromium and silicon with the chemical formula Cr3Si.

References

Chromium compounds
Group 6 silicides